Justin Chatwin is a Canadian actor of film and television. After making his film debut in the musical comedy Josie and the Pussycats (2001), Chatwin guest-starred in several television series and had minor appearances in two unsuccessful films, Taking Lives and Superbabies: Baby Geniuses 2 (both 2004). That same year, Newsweek magazine singled him out as an "Actor to watch" based on his work in the three-part miniseries Traffic.

Chatwin had his breakthrough performance as Tom Cruise's rebellious son in the blockbuster War of the Worlds (2005), directed by Steven Spielberg. He followed that up by portraying a teenage drug dealer in The Chumscrubber, a black comedy which premiered at the Sundance Film Festival. Chatwin later headlined the 2007 supernatural thriller The Invisible, and starred as Goku in Dragonball Evolution (2009), an action-adventure film directed by James Wong based on the Japanese manga Dragon Ball.

Throughout the 2010s, Chatwin has found more success on television, starring as a lovesick car thief on the Showtime dramedy Shameless between 2011 and 2015. After a recurring role in the third season of BBC's Orphan Black, Chatwin played a cartoonist in the CBS murder mystery drama American Gothic (2016). That same year, he portrayed superhero Grant Gordon / The Ghost in "The Return of Doctor Mysterio", the 2016 Christmas Special of the science fiction series Doctor Who. Chatwin has also starred as scientist Erik Wallace in the two season Netflix series Another Life.
   
Simultaneously, Chatwin worked on a number of independent films, playing a diverse spectrum of characters in a variety of genres. He portrayed an Italian dancer in Daniel Roby's disco drama Funkytown (2011), a rock star in Jeffrey St. Jules' sci-fi musical Bang Bang Baby (2014), which earned him a Canadian Screen Awards nomination for Best Supporting Actor, a cat-turned-human in Finn Taylor's romantic comedy Unleashed (2016), a modern cowboy in Blake Robbins' western The Scent of Rain and Lightning (2017), a rookie detective in the crime thriller The Assassin's Code (2018), and a free-spirited bartender in the coming-of-age dramedy Summer Night (2019) directed by Joseph Cross.
  
Chatwin's long-time passion for extreme sports, travelling and motorcycles, led to the documentary series No Good Reason (2020), which follows his journey from Vancouver to Patagonia on motorcycle.

Film

Television

Stage

Documentaries

Music videos

References

External links
 

Chatwin, Justin
Chatwin, Justin